Burtis Island is a small island lying  east of Cape Dart, Siple Island, off the coast of Marie Byrd Land. It was mapped by the U.S. Geological Survey from U.S. Navy aerial photography, 1962–65, and named by the Advisory Committee on Antarctic Names for William J. Burtis, an ionospheric physicist at Byrd Station in 1965.

References 

Islands of Marie Byrd Land